Singhrawan is a small town between Barhi and Chauparan in the Hazaribagh district of Jharkhand state in India. Its PIN code is 825406. This village is popularly known for its development.

Banks
A branch of the State Bank of India in Singhrawan has an ATM providing a 24-hour facility.

Education
Schools in Singhrawan include the Sundar Lal Jain High School, affiliated to the Jharkhand Academic Council, the Vector Public School, the Government Middle School, Pushkar Public School and the Noble Kindergarten. The nearest schools to Singhrawan affiliated to the CBSE are in Chauparan and Barhi.

Transport

Road
Singhrawan is on National Highway 2 between Kolkata and New Delhi, and close to the National Highway 31 from Patna to Ranchi.

Railway

Villages in Hazaribagh district